A suborder of brachiopods containing the families:

 Family Strophochonetidae
 Family Chonostrophiidae
 Family Anopliidae
 Family Eodevonariidae
 Family Chonetidae
 Family Rugosochonetidae
 Family Daviesiellidae

References

Strophomenata